Harvest Bloody Harvest is a music DVD released by Industrial metal band Red Harvest. It was released on 18 September 2006.

Content
The DVD contains live footage filmed at the Sonic Solstice Festival in the Rockefeller Music Hall, Oslo, Norway on September 24, 2005. There were two DVD boxes released, one was a limited edition metal case, the other one a normal case. It also contains some music videos, rehearsal footage and various other pieces of footage.

Live track list
 Fall of Fate
 Mekanizm
 GodTech
 Cybernaut
 Absolut Dunkelheit
 Junk-O-Rama
 Teknocrate
 I.P.P.
 Cold Dark Matter
 A.E.P.
 Beyond The End

Music Videos

 Wounds
 Burning Wheel
 Sick Transit Gloria Mundi

External links
 Red Harvest's official website

Red Harvest (band) video albums
Season of Mist albums